Hasselt's bamboo shark (Chiloscyllium hasseltii) is a bamboo shark in the family Hemiscylliidae found around Thailand, Malaysia and Indonesia, between latitudes 23° N and 10° S, and longitude 91° E and 133° E; residing inshore. Its length is up to 60 cm.

Features: Much like C. punctatum, adults usually have no color patterns, but the juveniles have transverse dark bands with black edging.

Reproduction: These sharks are oviparous. The eggs will attach to benthic marine plants and hatch in December. Their average size at hatching is 94 to 120 mm.

See also

 List of sharks
 Carpet shark

References

 
 Compagno, Dando & Fowler, Sharks of the World, Princeton University Press, New Jersey 2005 

Hasselt's bamboo shark
Marine fauna of Southeast Asia
Hasselt's bamboo shark